Suschitzky is a surname. Notable people with the surname include:

Peter Suschitzky (born 1940), British cinematographer
Wolfgang Suschitzky, (1912–2016), Austrian-British photographer and cinematographer
Edith Tudor Hart (née Edith Suschitzky; 1908–1973), Austrian-British photographer, communist-sympathiser and spy for the Soviet Union